Ashwin Willemse (born 8 September 1981 in Caledon, Cape Province) is a retired South African rugby union player. He played at wing for the national team, the Springboks.

After winning an IRB Under-21 World Cup gold medal for South Africa in 2002, the winger set about gaining Super 12 experience with the Cats. Willemse's pace, speed and power contributed to him being selected for his test debut against Scotland. He was included in the South Africa 2003 Rugby World Cup squad and scored a solo try against Samoa. Willemse's achievements of 2003 were topped by scooping up three awards at the annual SA Rugby function - Player of the Year, Most Promising Player of the Year and Players' Player of the Year.

Willemse was injured for most of the 2004–2006 seasons. However, he was selected for the Springbok squad during the 2007 international season and Tri nations, and was selected for the 2007 Rugby World Cup squad. He then signed a two-year contract with Biarritz Olympique, joining a host of other Springboks choosing to continue their careers abroad after RWC 2007. 

Willemse subsequently retired from international rugby stating "there are no controversial issues around my decision at all. I love the team, and the guys are exceptional. It was such a breath of fresh air being able to return to the Lions after some time overseas last year, and it has been so exciting. I have been able to play the best rugby of my career with the Lions, and I will miss each and every one of my teammates. The time, however, has come for me to move onto the next phase of my life".

In 2012, Willemse launched the GreenSmile Foundation. It is dedicated to helping educate and create better opportunities for children from socio-economic hardships.

In May 2018, while providing live analysis, Willemse walked off the Supersport set, as a result of conflicts with his co-presenters, Nick Mallett and Naas Botha. Willemse insinuated that his actions were a result of racism on the part of Mallett and Botha. An independent enquiry into the incident disproved the allegations.

References

External links

1981 births
Living people
People from Theewaterskloof Local Municipality
Cape Coloureds
South African people of Dutch descent
Rugby union wings
South African rugby union players
South Africa international rugby union players
Golden Lions players
Lions (United Rugby Championship) players
Biarritz Olympique players
South African expatriate rugby union players
Expatriate rugby union players in France
South African expatriate sportspeople in France
South Africa international rugby sevens players
Male rugby sevens players
Rugby union players from the Western Cape